Shaikh Rashid Bin Ibrahim Al Muraikhi is a prominent Sufi Sunni Islamic scholar and teacher in Bahrain. He used to be the khateeb of the Shaikh Isa Bin Ali Mosque in Muharraq until 1988. He has been praised for his role in bridging the Sunni-Shia sectarian divide in Bahrain and has warm relations with Shia scholars in Bahrain. As a leader of the Sufi tradition in Bahrain, he has been a target of criticism by puritanical Salafist activists for participating and endorsing Sufi ceremony such as Al-Maulid Al-Nabawi (the birth of Muhammad) in which he recites poems about the event.

His son, Shaikh Ibrahim Al Muraikhi, is the chief justice of the Supreme Sunni Sharia Court in Bahrain and the president of the Imam Malik ibn Anas Society. The Imam Malik Society is the only registered Sufi organization in Bahrain.

Among Shaikh Rashid's published works is Raf' al-Astar 'an Shubuhat wa Dalalat Sahib al- Hiwar ("Exposing the Insinuations and Aggravations of the Author of the 'Debate with al-Maliki").

Among his teachers are Shaikh Mohammed Al Hijazi of Muharraq, Shaikh Mohammed Abil Mulla of al-Hasa, Shaikh Abbas Bin Alawi Al Maliki of Mecca (brother of Muhammad Alawi al-Maliki), and Shaikh Abdul Qadir Al Saggaf  of Jeddah.

References
 Spreading the message of love, Gulf Daily News, 12 July 2009
 Sufi clerics plan German pilgrimage, Gulf Daily News, 12 July 2009
 أكد أنهم أولى بالسلف من غيرهم... شيخ الصوفية في البحرين راشد المريخي: //البحرين - Al Wasat, 7 October 2008
 مبادرات المريخي... أم بيانات السعيدي؟ Al Wasat, 18 October 2008
 Advice to Our Brothers the Ulema of Najd - Yusuf al-Rifa`i'
 شيخ الصوفية ينفي الاحتفالات المختلطة بين الرجال والنساء - Al Arabiya - 1 July 2007
 Imam Malik Society

Bahraini Sunni Muslims
Bahraini writers
Malikis
Sunni Muslim scholars of Islam
Bahraini Sufis
Living people
Year of birth missing (living people)